Peter Rösel (born February 2, 1945, in Dresden) is a German concert pianist.

Appearances
Rösel has appeared for years at international festivals
(Salzburg, Edinburgh, London Proms, Perth, Hollywood Bowl, Hong Kong) and with many major orchestras, such as Los Angeles Philharmonic and Royal Philharmonic Orchestra, Detroit Symphony Orchestra and Berlin Philharmonic.

He has performed with renowned conductors, Rudolf Kempe, Horst Stein, Yuri Temirkanov, Tennstedt and Vonk.
With Kurt Masur and the Gewandhaus Orchestra of Leipzig he has performed on international stages over two hundred times.

Symphonic highlights of recent years have included concerts with
the London Philharmonic Orchestra,
the Gulbenkian Orchestra of Lisbon,
the Netherlands Philharmonic Orchestra,
the KBS Symphony Orchestra,
the Mozarteum Orchestra,
New Japan Philharmonic,
the Gewandhaus Orchestra of Leipzig,
the German Symphony Orchestra,
the Staatskapelle Dresden under such conductors as
Kurt Sanderling,
Gunther Herbig,
Hartmut Haenchen,
Dmitri Kitajenko,
Hubert Soudant,
Herbert Blomstedt,
Andrey Boreyko and
Daniel Harding.

In 2005 he played all five Beethoven concertos in the Semper Opera House with Kioi Sinfonietta Tokyo.

Numerous recordings available on CD by Peter Rösel, including an outstanding recording of the complete piano works of Johannes Brahms.

External links
 

German classical pianists
Male classical pianists
1945 births
Living people